Jamiroquai are an English funk and acid jazz band from London. Formed in 1992, they are fronted by vocalist Jay Kay, and were prominent in the London-based funk and acid jazz movement of the 1990s. They built on their acid jazz sound in their early releases and later drew from rock, disco, electronic and Latin music genres. Lyrically, the group has addressed social and environmental justice. Kay has remained as the only original member through several line-up changes.

The band made their debut under Acid Jazz Records but subsequently found mainstream success under Sony. While under this label, three of their albums have charted at number one in the UK, including Emergency on Planet Earth (1993), Synkronized (1999) and A Funk Odyssey (2001). The band's 1998 single, "Deeper Underground", was also number one in their native country.

As of 2017, Jamiroquai had sold more than 26 million albums worldwide. Their third album, Travelling Without Moving (1996), received a Guinness World Record as the best-selling funk album in history. The music video for its lead single, "Virtual Insanity", also contributed to the band's success. The song was named Video of the Year at the 1997 MTV Video Music Awards and earned the band a Grammy Award in 1998.

History

1992–1993: Formation and Emergency on Planet Earth
Jay Kay was sending songs to record companies, including a hip-hop single released in 1986 under the label StreetSounds. During this time, Kay was influenced by Native American and First Nation peoples and their philosophies; this led to the creation of "When You Gonna Learn", a song covering social issues. After he had it recorded, Kay fought with his producer, who took out half of the lyrics and produced the song based on what was charting at the time. With the track restored to his preference, the experience helped Kay realise he "wanted a proper live band with a proper live sound". The band would be named "Jamiroquai", a portmanteau of the words "jam" and the name of a Native American confederacy, the Iroquois. He was signed to Acid Jazz Records in 1991 after he sent a demo tape of himself covering a song by the Brand New Heavies. Kay gradually gathered band members, including Wallis Buchanan, who played the didgeridoo. Kay's manager scouted keyboardist Toby Smith, who joined the group as Kay's songwriting partner. In 1992, Jamiroquai began their career by performing in the British club scene. They released "When You Gonna Learn" as their debut single, charting outside the UK Top 50 on its initial release. In the following year, Stuart Zender became the band's bassist by audition.

After the success of "When You Gonna Learn", the band were offered major-label contracts. Kay signed a one-million-dollar, eight-album record deal with Sony Soho2. He was the only member under contract, but he would share his royalties with his band members in accordance to their contributions as musicians. Their label for US releases would be under the Work Group. The band released their debut album, Emergency on Planet Earth, where it entered the UK albums chart at number 1. Kevin L. Carter of The Philadelphia Inquirer commented that the album "is full of upbeat, multi-hued pop tunes based heavily in acid jazz, '70s fusion, funk and soul, reggae and world music". With it, the band would continue to build upon their acid-jazz sounds in the following years. The album's ecologically charged concept gave Kay press coverage, although Mark Jenkins of The Washington Post found the record's sloganeering "as crude as the music is slick".

1994–2000: The Return of the Space Cowboy–Synkronized

The band's original drummer, Nick van Gelder, failed to return from holiday and was replaced by Derrick McKenzie, who recorded with the group in one take for his audition. They issued their second album, The Return of the Space Cowboy, in 1994, and it ranked at number 2 in the UK chart. During its recording, Kay was in a creative block, worsened by his increasing drug use at the time; which resulted in its complex songwriting. However, the record was said to have "capture[ed] this first phase of Jamiroquai at their very best", according to Daryl Easlea of BBC Music. Josef Woodard from Entertainment Weekly wrote that its "syncopated grooves and horn-lined riffs" were "played by humans, not samplers".

Released in 1996, Travelling Without Moving reached number 24 in the Billboard 200 and number 2 in the UK albums chart. With 8 million copies sold worldwide, it has been listed in the Guinness World Records as the best-selling funk album in history since 2001. The album's lead single, "Virtual Insanity", gained popularity for its music video, which was heavily played on MTV. Containing symphonic and jungle elements, Kay aimed for a more accessible sound. Ted Kessler of NME saw Travelling Without Moving as an improvement from previous albums, while critic Stephen Thomas Erlewine commented that it did not have "uniform consistenc[ies]" in comparison.

While the group were preparing their fourth album, Synkronized (1999), Zender left Jamiroquai due to internal conflicts with Kay. While Zender had not been involved in the album's songwriting, the group chose to scrap his recorded tracks to avoid lawsuits, and Nick Fyffe was recruited for new sessions. This resulted in what was thought to be both a "tighter, more angry collection of songs" for Synkronized, and a change of musical direction from "creating propulsive collections of looooong  tunes, [and] speaking out against injustice". Some of the album's tracks, including "Canned Heat", display a hi-NRG and house style, while slower tempos on others were said to "ease the pressure for [Kay's] more romantic musings". The album reached number 1 in the UK albums chart and number 28 in the US Billboard 200. A year prior to Synkronized, "Deeper Underground" was released as a single for the Godzilla soundtrack and reached number one in the UK singles chart.

2001–2016: A Funk Odyssey–Rock Dust Light Star

The group issued their follow-up, A Funk Odyssey, a disco record exploring Latin music influences, in 2001. It introduced guitarist Rob Harris, whose playing in the album "melts seductively into a mix that occasionally incorporates lavish orchestration", according to Jim Abbot of Orlando Sentinel. Slant Magazine's Sal Cinquemani claimed: "Like its predecessors, Odyssey mixes self-samplage with Jamiroquai’s now-signature robo-funk." The album topped the chart in the UK. In the US, under Epic Records, it reached number 44 in the US Billboard 200. It was the last album to feature Smith, who left the band in the following year to spend more time with his family.

Their sixth album, Dynamite, was released in 2005 and reached number 3 in the UK; Rashod D. Ollison of The Baltimore Sun said the album "boasts a harder digital edge ... With heavier beats, manipulated guitar lines and odd digital textures, Dynamite is less organic than Jamiroquai's other efforts". Its tracks "Feels Just Like It Should" and "Love Blind" were characterised as "[having] a fatter, dirtier sound than usual". In 2006, Kay's contract with Sony ended, which led to the issue of the band's greatest hits collection, High Times: Singles 1992–2006. It charted at number one in the UK after its first week of release. The following year, Jamiroquai performed at the Gig in the Sky, a concert held on a private Boeing 757 in association with Sony Ericsson. The band thus currently hold the Guinness World Record for "fastest concert", performed on the aircraft whilst travelling at 1,017 km/h (632 mph).

Rock Dust Light Star was released in 2010 under Mercury Records, where it charted at number 7 in the UK. Kay considered the album as "a real band record" that "capture[s] the flow of our live performances". Critics have seen this as a return to their organic funk and soul style, as it forgoes "the electro textures that followed the band into the new millennium", according to Luke Winkie of MusicOMH. It also has a sound Thomas H. Green of The Telegraph described as "Californian Seventies funk rock".

2017–present: Automaton and beyond 
Jamiroquai released their 2017 album, Automaton, through Virgin EMI. It was their eighth studio album and the first in seven years, reaching number 4 in the UK. It was produced by Kay and band keyboardist Matt Johnson, and it "carefully balance[s] their signature sound with… EDM, soul and trap sounds", according to Ryan Patrick of Exclaim!. Craig Jenkins of Vulture writes: "Arrangements that used to spill out over horn, flute, didgeridoo, and string accompaniments now lean closer to French house". By 2018, the group's line-up consisted of Kay, Harris, McKenzie, Johnson, Paul Turner on bass guitar, percussionist Sola Akingbola, Nate Williams on guitar and keyboards and Howard Whiddett with Ableton Live.

Jay Kay announced on the back notes of their 2021 single "Everybody's Going To The Moon", that the band were working on a new album.

Artistry

Musical style and influences 

Jamiroquai's music is generally termed acid jazz, funk, disco, soul, house, and R&B. Their sound has been described by J. D. Considine as having an "anything-goes attitude, an approach that leaves the band open to anything". Tom Moon wrote that the band "embrac[es] old-school funk, Philly-soul strings, the crisp keyboard sounds of the '70s and even hints of jazz fusion", blending these with "agitated, aggressive dance rhythms to create an easygoing feel that looks both backward and forward". Ben Sisario facetiously commented that Jay Kay and Toby Smith as songwriters, "studied Innervisions-era [Stevie] Wonder carefully, and just about everything the group has recorded sounds like it could in fact have been played by [Wonder] himself."

Kay is the primary songwriter of Jamiroquai. When composing, he sings melodies and beats for band members to transcribe to their instrumentation. The band relies on analog sounds, such as running keyboards through vintage effects pedals "to get the warmth and the clarity of those instruments". Parry Gettelman of the Orlando Sentinel described Kay's vocals as "not identifiably male or female, black or white". Other writers said Toby Smith's keyboard arrangements were "psychedelic and soulful", and compared Stuart Zender's bass playing to the work of Marcus Miller. Wallis Buchanan on didgeridoo was met with either praise or annoyance from critics.

Kay was influenced by Roy Ayers, Herbie Hancock, Lou Donaldson, Grant Green, Sly Stone, Gil Scott-Heron, and hip-hop and its culture. He was introduced to much of these influences in the mid-1980s by British club DJs. "I'd been into Stevie and all that… Then I got into the JBs, Maceo Parker and the Meters, that more raw, funky thing. I'd never really heard so many instruments in one go … I decided around that time to try to make music built around those loose, open grooves." A 2003 compilation titled Late Night Tales: Jamiroquai under Azuli Records, also contains a selection of some of the band's late 1970s R&B, disco and quiet storm influences. Kay and the group have been compared to Stevie Wonder, with some critics accusing the band of copying black artists. In response, Kay said "we never tried to hide our influences". The band references them as Kay maintained Jamiroquai's own sound: "it's about the style of music you aim for, not the exact sound. If you just sample Barry White or Sly Stone, that's one thing; to get their spirit is different."

Lyrics 

Jamiroquai's lyrics have touched on socially charged themes. With Emergency on Planet Earth (1993), it revolves around environmental awareness and speaks out against war. The Return of the Space Cowboy (1994) contains themes of homelessness, Native American rights, youth protests, and slavery. "Virtual Insanity" from Travelling Without Moving (1996) is about the prevalence of technology and the replication and simulation of life. The lyrics of Automaton (2017) allude to dystopian films and compromised relationships within a digital landscape.

However, critics wrote that the band had focused more on "boy–girl seductions" and "having fun" rather than social justice, and that Kay's interest in sports cars contradicts his earlier beliefs. Kay was reluctant to release Travelling Without Moving (1996), as it adopted a motorcar concept, but he added: "just because I love to drive a fast car, that doesn't mean I believe in [destroying the environment.]" He also stated in separate interviews he was tired of being "[a] troubadour of social conscious[ness]", and "after a while you realise that people won't boogie and dance to [politics]."

Stage and visuals 

While critics said the group tended towards 1970s funk and soul archetypes in their performances, Kay's presence received praise, with critics noting his strong vocals and energetic dance moves on stage. Robert Hilburn said Kay "establish[es] a rapport with the audience" and has a "disarming sense of humor". Helen Brown of The Telegraph was more critical, writing of a 2011 concert that there was no "deeply personal emotion" in its set list or in Kay's vocals, and "much of the material is exhilarating in the moment, forgettable thereafter".

With their visual style being described as "sci-fi and futuristic", Jamiroquai's music video of "Virtual Insanity" made them "icons of the music-video format", according to Spencer Kornhaber from The Atlantic. It was directed by Jonathan Glazer, and depicted Kay "perform[ing] in a room where the floors, walls and furniture all moved simultaneously."

Kay has worn elaborate headgear, some he designed himself. He said that the headgear is part of his stage persona and give him a spiritual power described by the Iroquois as "orenda". The illuminating helmet that appears in the music video for "Automaton" was designed by Moritz Waldemeyer for Kay to control its lights and movements and to portray him as an endangered species. Kay also wore Native American head-dresses, which was met with criticism by Indian Country Today, commenting he had worn sacred regalia of the First Nations.

Legacy 

As a prominent component of the London-based funk and acid-jazz movement of the 1990s, writer Kenneth Prouty said: "few acid jazz groups have reached the level of visibility in the pop music mainstream as London-born Jamiroquai". The success of the 1996 single "Virtual Insanity" led to the climax of "1970s soul and funk that early acid jazz artists had initiated". The band were also credited for popularising the didgeridoo. Artists who mention the group as an influence include Chance the Rapper, SZA, Kamaal Williams, the Internet, Calvin Harris, and Tyler, the Creator. According to Tony Farsides of The Guardian, "Jamiroquai's musical prowess goes largely ignored. Whilst the band have received plaudits from American heavyweights such as Quincy Jones and Maurice White of Earth, Wind And Fire, Jamiroquai fight to be taken seriously in the UK." Writing for the same newspaper, Ian Gittins said the group "have long been shunned by music's tastemakers for a perceived naffness, and have shown their utter disregard for this critical snobbery by getting bigger and bigger". Sisario gave a negative review of the band's discography in The Rolling Stone Album Guide in 2004, finding much of their material to be identical.

Jamiroquai were the third best-selling UK act of the 1990s, after the Spice Girls and Oasis. As of April 2017, they have sold more than 26 million albums worldwide. Despite finding popularity in the UK with high-charting albums, the band could not maintain their relevance in the United States. Travelling Without Moving was their most successful release in the country, but they have since lost commercial momentum. The band's studio albums became less frequently released. Kay said in 2013: "I will only put out an album now when I am inspired to do so".

Awards and nominations 

During the course of their career, Jamiroquai have received 15 Brit Award nominations. In 1999, the band won an Ivor Novello Award for an Outstanding Song Collection. Front-man Kay was given a BMI Presidents Award "in recognition of his profound influence on songwriting within the music industry." Jamiroquai received a nomination for Best Pop Album at the 1998 Grammy Awards and won Best Performance by a Duo Or Group for "Virtual Insanity". The band were also nominated for Best Short Form Music Video for "Feels Just Like It Should" at the 2005 Grammy Awards.  For their "Virtual Insanity" music video, Jamiroquai had three nominations at the 1997 MTV Video Music Awards and won Breakthrough Video and Video of the Year.

Discography 

 Emergency on Planet Earth (1993)
 The Return of the Space Cowboy (1994)
 Travelling Without Moving (1996)
 Synkronized (1999)
 A Funk Odyssey (2001)
 Dynamite (2005)
 Rock Dust Light Star (2010)
 Automaton (2017)

Members 

Current members
 Jay Kay – lead vocals
 Derrick McKenzie – drums
 Sola Akingbola – percussion
 Rob Harris – guitar
 Matt Johnson – keyboards
 Paul Turner – bass
 Howard Whiddett – Ableton Live
 Nate Williams – guitar and keyboards

Former members
 Toby Smith – keyboards (died 2017)
 Simon Bartholomew – guitar
 Glenn Nightengale – guitar
 Gavin Dodds – guitar
 Simon Katz – guitar
 Stuart Zender – bass
 Nick Fyffe – bass
 Nick Van Gelder – drums
 Maurizio Ravalico – percussion
 Kofi Karikari – percussion
 DJ D-Zire – turntable
 Wallis Buchanan – didgeridoo
 Gary Barnacle – saxophone, flute 
 John Thirkell – trumpet, flugelhorn
 Mike Smith – saxophone

Notes

References

Sources

External links 

 
 
 

 
Acid jazz ensembles
British contemporary R&B musical groups
British soul musical groups
English funk musical groups
English pop music groups
Jazz fusion ensembles
Musical groups from London
Ivor Novello Award winners
Grammy Award winners
Musical groups established in 1992
Acid Jazz Records artists
S2 Records artists
Epic Records artists
Mercury Records artists
Virgin EMI Records artists